Black Flowers is a 2009 album by the Canadian music organization Art of Time Ensemble featuring singer Sarah Slean.

On May 10 and 11, 2007, Sarah Slean was the featured artist in the Art of Time Ensemble's Songbook series, which is "artistic director Andrew Burashko's pursuit to present music - avant-garde, popular, cabaret, jazz, classical - in ways audiences haven't experienced." Black Flowers was released on June 2, 2009 through Pheromone Recordings.

Track listing

Personnel

Sarah Slean - Vocals
Andrew Burashko - Piano
Ben Bowman - Violin
John Johnson - Clarinet, Flute, Tenor Saxophone & Soprano Saxophone
George Koller - Bass
Rob Piltch - Guitar
Shauna Rolston - Cello

Production

Jonathan Goldsmith - Producer
Walter Sobczak - Engineer

Recorded at Puck's Farm, February 13–15, 2008.

References

2009 albums
Art of Time Ensemble albums
Sarah Slean albums